Military Base, Semnan ( – Pāygāh-ye Havāīī; also known as Manṭaqeh-ye Neẓāmī) is a village and military installation in Howmeh Rural District, in the Central District of Semnan County, Semnan Province, Iran. At the 2006 census, its population was 417, in 131 families.

References 

Populated places in Semnan County
Military installations of Iran